Fabinho (literally little Fábio) real name Fábio de Souza (born 10 April 1975) is a Brazilian footballer. He is currently coach with FC Herisau.

External links
 Career at Swiss Football League 
CBF

Brazilian footballers
Brazilian expatriate footballers
FC Wil players
SR Delémont players
FC St. Gallen players
FC Schaffhausen players
Swiss Super League players
Expatriate footballers in Switzerland
Sportspeople from Rio de Janeiro (state)
1975 births
Living people
Association football midfielders